Nasvang is an Oceanic language spoken in southeast Malekula, Vanuatu, by about 275 speakers.

The languages surrounding Nasvang include, or used to include, Port Sandwich, Nisvai, Sörsörian, Axamb and Navwien.

References

Malekula languages
Languages of Vanuatu